Capeta is a genus of spiders in the family Salticidae (jumping spiders).

Name
Capeta is a Brazilian word for devil.
tridens ("trident") refers to the three projections in the male palp seen in ventral view (the embolus, its basal projection and the retrolateral tibial apophysis).

Species
 Capeta cachimbo Ruiz & Brescovit, 2006
 Capeta tridens Ruiz & Brescovit, 2005

Distribution
C. tridens is only known from the State of Bahia in Brazil, while C. cachimbo was found in the Serra do Cachimbo, Pará.

References

  (2009): The world spider catalog, version 9.5. American Museum of Natural History.

External links
Three new genera of jumping spider from Brazil (Araneae, Salticidae) (2005)
  (2006): Gavarilla, a new genus of jumping spider from Brazil, and description of two new species of the genera Capeta Ruiz & Brescovit and Amatorculus Ruiz & Brescovit (Araneae, Salticidae, Sitticinae). PDF

Salticidae genera
Spiders of Brazil
Sitticini